Kiltormer is a village about 8 miles from Ballinasloe and situated in county Galway.

Kiltormer GAA won the All-Ireland Hurling Championship title in 1992. The semi-final against Cashel King Cormacs from Tipperary was a three match series, and Kiltormer beat Birr in the final.

See also
 List of towns and villages in Ireland

References

External links
Photo of the 1982 hurling team
Kiltormer’s plight shows the good old days don’t last forever

Towns and villages in County Galway